Pierre Delaval is a French cross-country skier. He represented France at the 1984 Winter Paralympics and at the 1988 Winter Paralympics, both held in Innsbruck, Austria.

At the 1984 Winter Paralympics, he won the gold medal both at the Men's Middle Distance 10 km LW5/7 and Men's Short Distance 5 km LW5/7 events.

At the 1988 Winter Paralympics, he won the gold medal at the Men's Short Distance 5 km LW5/7 event. He also won the silver medal at the Men's Long Distance 15 km LW5/7 event.

References

External links 
 

Living people
Year of birth missing (living people)
Place of birth missing (living people)
French male cross-country skiers
Cross-country skiers at the 1984 Winter Paralympics
Cross-country skiers at the 1988 Winter Paralympics
Medalists at the 1984 Winter Paralympics
Medalists at the 1988 Winter Paralympics
Paralympic gold medalists for France
Paralympic silver medalists for France
Paralympic medalists in cross-country skiing
Paralympic cross-country skiers of France
20th-century French people